The Lawrence of Arabia Medal is an award conferred by the Royal Society for Asian Affairs.

History
Lawrence of Arabia Medal was established in 1935 in the honor of Lawrence of Arabia.

Recipients

 1936: John Bagot Glubb
 1937: Charles Bell
 1938: Claude Scudamore Jarvis
 1939: Harold Ingrams and Doreen Ingrams
 1940: Frederick Peake
 1941: C. E. Corry
 1942: Mildred Cable
 1943: Orde Wingate
 1944: Ursula Graham Bower
 1947: Charles Pawsey
 1948: Henry Holland
 1949: Freddie Spencer Chapman
 1953: John Hunt, Baron Hunt
 1954: Wilfred Thesiger
 1960: Violet Dickson
 1961: Stephen Hemsley Longrigg
 1964: Nevill Barbour
 1965: Hugh Boustead
 1966: Charles Belgrave
 1971: Seton Lloyd
 2016: Michael Asher

References

British awards
Awards established in 1935